Alexander Stewart (1699–1781) was an Irish landowner who grew rich by inheriting a fortune from Robert Cowan, a former governor of Bombay. His son Robert became the 1st Marquess of Londonderry.

Birth and origins 
Alexander was born in 1699 or 1700 at Ballylawn Castle, near Manorcunningham in County Donegal. He was the second son of William Stewart and his wife. His father had his lands consolidated by Charles I under the name of Stewart's Court, raised a Williamite troop of horse in the run-up to the Siege of Derry and was therefore known as Colonel William Stewart.

Alexander's grandfather is not known by name, but Alexander was a great-grandson of Charles Stewart, whose father John was given land at Ballylawn in County Donegal in the plantation of Ulster, built Ballylawn Castle on that land, and held fishing rights in Lough Swilly. John Stewart is likely to have been a younger son of the Stewarts of Garlies in Galloway, Scotland.

Alexander's mother, whose first name is unknown, was a daughter of William Stewart of Fort Stewart, near Ramelton, County Donegal. The Stewart family background was Scots-Irish and Presbyterian.

He appears below as the younger of two brothers:
Thomas (died 1740), inherited Ballylawn and pursued a military career but died childless in 1740
Alexander (1699–1781)

Early life 
Alexander, as a younger son, went into commerce with an apprenticeship at Belfast and became a successful merchant in the Baltic trade. He also became an elder in the First Presbyterian Church in Rosemary Street, Belfast. During his residence in Belfast he became a convinced Whig, in line with the general reformist sentiment of the Presbyterian town.

Marriage and children 
Alexander Stewart married on 30 June 1737 in Dublin a cousin, Mary Cowan, daughter of John Cowan, alderman of Londonderry and his wife Anne Stewart, daughter of Alexander Stewart of Ballylawn, and sister of the former Governor of Bombay, Robert Cowan, who had died on 21 February 1737 in London.

 
Alexander and Mary had seven children:
Anne (1738–1781)
Robert (1739–1821), became the 1st Marquess of Londonderry
William (1741–1742)
Francis (born 1742)
John (1744–1762)
Alexander (1746–1831), married Mary Moore, the 3rd daughter of the 1st Marquess of Drogheda
Mary (born 1747), died young

Brother's death and succession 
In 1740 his elder brother, Thomas, died and Alexander inherited the Ballylawn estate.

Cowan inheritance 
He then acquired the rights to Robert Cowan's substantial estate. Being now rich, Stewart retired from business in 1743, and used the money from the Cowan inheritance to become a substantial landowner in County Down by buying estates at Comber and Newtownards in 1744.

Mount Stewart 
Around 1750 Alexander Stewart rebuilt a house called Mount Pleasant on his estate near Newtownards and renamed it Mount Stewart. In 1780 Stewart commissioned the Temple of the Winds at Mount Stewart from James "Athenian" Stuart. This is an octagonal neo-classical building that was completed by his son Robert after his death.

In 1755 he was left the property of William Bruce (1702–1755), a Dublin bookseller from Killyleagh, which he divided between Bruce's relations.

In politics 
In 1759 the member of the Parliament of Ireland for the city of Londonderry, William Scott, was raised to the bench. Initially William Hamilton was elected to succeed him, but the election was declared void. Alexander Stewart was returned in his place in April 1760, but he was also declared not duly elected. Eventually Hamilton represented the constituency from May 1760 until his death later that year.

Death and timeline 
Stewart died on 2 April 1781 and was succeeded by his eldest son Robert.

The Stewart family papers are preserved in the Public Record Office of Northern Ireland.

Notes, citations, and sources

Notes

Citations

Sources 
 
  – (Snippet view)
  – The 31st Edition gives Stewarts as ancestors whereas the 99th Edition gives Tempests and Vanes.
  – Scotland and Ireland
  – (for timeline)
  – Short biographies in the biographical notes
 
 
 

1690s births
1781 deaths
People from County Londonderry
Alexander